The Tower of Orchinu is a ruined Genoese tower  located in the commune of Cargèse on the Corsica.

The tower was one of a series of coastal defences constructed by the Republic of Genoa between 1530 and 1620 to stem the attacks by Barbary pirates. The Tour d'Orchinu tower was built between 1605 and 1606 under the direction of Giacomo della Piana.

See also
List of Genoese towers in Corsica

References

External links
 Includes information on how to reach 90 towers and many photographs.

Towers in Corsica